Ekin Deligöz (born 21 April 1971) is a Turkish-German politician of Alliance '90/The Greens who has been serving as Parliamentary State Secretary in the Federal Ministry of Family Affairs, Senior Citizens, Women and Youth in the coalition government of Chancellor Olaf Scholz since 2021. She has been serving as a member of the Bundestag since 1998.

Early life
Of ethnic Turkish origin, Deligöz was born in Tokat, Turkey; her family moved to West Germany in 1979. She attended school in Weißenhorn and afterwards partook in Administrative Studies in Konstanz and Vienna earning a degree in 1998. In February 1997, she acquired German citizenship.

Political career
Deligöz joined the Greens as a student member and belonged to the Bavaria chapter of the Greens' youth organization. She entered the Bundestag in 1998, and was re-elected in 2002, 2005 and 2009. Deligöz was re-elected for the fourth time into the federal parliament following the 2013 election. She is one of the eleven politicians of Turkish descent who won a seat in the federal parliament, including seven women.

Between 2002 and 2005, Deligöz served as Chief Whip of the Green Party's parliamentary group. From 2009 until 2013, she part of the group's leadership around co-chairs Renate Künast and Jürgen Trittin. In this capacity, she was part of a series of round table talks in 2010 and 2011 to tackle a wave of child sexual abuse cases, including numerous allegations of abuse in the Roman Catholic Church; the talks were jointly chaired by ministers Sabine Leutheusser-Schnarrenberger, Annette Schavan, and Kristina Schröder.

A member of the Budget Committee and as deputy chairwoman of the Audit Committee from 2013 until 2021, Deligöz served as her parliamentary group's rapporteur on the annual budgets of the Federal Ministry of Labour and Social Affairs (BMAS); the Federal Ministry of Education and Research (BMBF); the Federal Ministry of Health (2013-2017); the Federal Ministry of Family Affairs, Senior Citizens, Women and Youth (BMFSFJ); the Office of the Federal President (2013–2021); the Federal Foreign Office (2018–2021); and the Federal Court of Auditors (2018–2021).

In the negotiations to form a so-called traffic light coalition of the Social Democratic Party (SPD), the Green Party and the Free Democratic Party (FDP) following the 2021 German elections, Deligöz was part of her party's delegation in the working group on children, youth and families, co-chaired by Serpil Midyatli, Katrin Göring-Eckardt and Stephan Thomae.

Other activities
 Gegen Vergessen – Für Demokratie, Member of the Board
 German Association for Public and Private Welfare 
 German Committee for UNICEF, Member of the Board

Controversy
When Deligöz voted in a favor of a symbolic resolution in 2016 that labels the 1915 killings of up to 1.5 million Armenians by Ottoman forces "genocide", a description that Turkey strongly rejects, she became one of eleven MPs of Turkish origin who received increased police protection and further security measures for both their professional and private activities. Also, Germany's Federal Foreign Office warned her against travelling to Turkey because her safety could not be guaranteed after statements by Turkish President Tayyip Erdogan suggesting that German lawmakers of Turkish origin had "tainted blood".

Personal life
Deligöz is married with two children.

See also 
 Turks in Germany

References

External links
Personal site
Ekin Deligöz Bundestag profile
Her works at the German National Library

1971 births
People from Tokat
Living people
Turkish emigrants to Germany
Naturalized citizens of Germany
Members of the Bundestag for Bavaria
Female members of the Bundestag
German politicians of Turkish descent
University of Konstanz alumni
University of Vienna alumni
Articles containing video clips
21st-century German women politicians
Members of the Bundestag 2021–2025
Members of the Bundestag 2017–2021
Members of the Bundestag 2013–2017
Members of the Bundestag 2009–2013
Members of the Bundestag 2005–2009
Members of the Bundestag 2002–2005
Members of the Bundestag 1998–2002
Members of the Bundestag for Alliance 90/The Greens
20th-century German women